The 1934 Ontario general election was the 19th general election held in the Province of Ontario, Canada.  It was held on June 19, 1934, to elect the 19th Legislative Assembly of Ontario ("MLAs").

The Ontario Liberal Party, led by Mitchell Hepburn, defeated the governing Ontario Conservative Party, led by George Stewart Henry. Hepburn was assisted by Harry Nixon's Progressive bloc of MLAs who ran in this election as Liberal-Progressives on the understanding that they would support a Hepburn led government. Nixon, himself, became a senior cabinet minister in the Hepburn government.

The Liberals won a majority in the Legislature, while the Conservatives lost four out of every five seats that they had won in the previous election.

The Co-operative Commonwealth Federation, in its first provincial election, ran 37 candidates and won a seat in the Ontario Legislature for the first time with the election of Samuel Lawrence in Hamilton East.

The United Farmers of Ontario had affiliated with the CCF but disaffiliated immediately prior to the 1934 election due to a row over suspected Communist infiltration of the party. Accordingly, two UFO nominated candidates, incumbent MLA Farquhar Oliver (Grey South) and Leslie Warner Oke, former MLA for Lambton East, ran as UFO candidates rather than with the CCF. Oliver was re-elected and later supported the Hepburn government.

Earl Hutchinson of Kenora was re-elected as a Labour MLA but resigned a month later to allow Peter Heenan, a former Labour MLA in the riding, to contest Kenora in a by-election as a Liberal so that he could be appointed to Cabinet. Hutchinson was then appointed vice-chairman of the Workmen's Compensation Board.

Redistribution and reduction of ridings

The Legislative Assembly was reduced from 112 seats to 90 as a result of an Act passed in 1933:

A subsequent Act in 1934 modified the limits of several Toronto ridings.

Results

|-
! colspan=2 rowspan=2 | Political party
! rowspan=2 | Party leader
! colspan=5 | MPPs
! colspan=3 | Votes
|-
! Candidates
!1929
!Dissol.
!1934
!±
!#
!%
! ± (pp)

|style="text-align:left;"|Mitchell Hepburn
|83
|13
|16
|65
|52
|735,531
|47.09%
|14.86

|style="text-align:left;"|George Stewart Henry
|90
|90
|88
|17
|73
|621,212
|39.77%
|16.89

|style="text-align:left;"|Harry Nixon
|4
|1
|1
|4
|3
|38,161
|2.44%
|1.90

|style="text-align:left;"|John Mitchell(party president)
|37
|–
|–
|1
|1
|108,961
|6.98%
|

|style="text-align:left;"|
|15
|–
|–
|1
|1
|17,462
|1.12%
|1.06

|style="text-align:left;"|Farquhar Oliver
|2
|1
|1
|1
|
|8,648
|0.55%
|0.71

|
|2
|1
|1
|1
|
|6,411
|0.41%
|0.58

|style="text-align:left;"|
|–
|4
|3
|–
|4
|colspan="3"|did not campaign

|style="text-align:left;"|
|2
|2
|2
|–
|2
|344
|0.02%
|2.14

|style="text-align:left;"|
|5
|–
|–
|–
|
|12,984
|0.83%
|

|style="text-align:left;"|
|14
|–
|–
|–
|
|9,774
|0.63%
|0.48

|style="text-align:left;"|Socialist-Labour
|style="text-align:left;"|
|5
|–
|–
|–
|
|1,607
|0.10%
|

|style="text-align:left;"|
|1
|–
|–
|–
|
|608
|0.04%
|

|style="text-align:left;"|Workers
|style="text-align:left;"|
|1
|–
|–
|–
|
|158
|0.01%
|

|style="text-align:left;"|
|–
|–
|–
|–
|
|colspan="3"|did not campaign

|colspan="3"|
|
|colspan="5"|
|-style="background:#E9E9E9;"
|colspan="3" style="text-align:left;"|Total
|236
|112
|112
|90
|
|1,561,861
|100.00%
|
|-
|colspan="8" style="text-align:left;"|Blank and invalid ballots
|align="right"|17,305
|style="background:#E9E9E9;" colspan="2"|
|-style="background:#E9E9E9;"
|colspan="8" style="text-align:left;"|Registered voters / turnout
|2,098,776
|75.24%
|18.61
|}

Reorganization of ridings

Seats that changed hands

Of the unaltered seats, there were 47 that changed allegiance in the election:

Conservative to Liberal
Bellwoods
Cochrane North
Cochrane South
Eglinton
Essex North
Essex South
Fort William
Hamilton Centre
Hamilton—Wentworth
Hastings West
Kent West
Lambton East
Lambton West
Middlesex North
Middlesex South
Niagara Falls
Northumberland
Ottawa East
Parry Sound
Peel

Port Arthur
Renfrew North
Riverdale
Russell
Sault Ste. Marie
Simcoe East
St. Andrew
St. George
St. Patrick
Stormont
Sudbury
Timiskaming
Waterloo South
Welland
Wellington South
Windsor—Sandwich
Windsor—Walkerville
York North
York West

Conservative to Liberal-Progressive
Kent East

Conservative to CCF
Hamilton East

Conservative to Independent
Brantford

Progressive to Liberal
Huron

Progressive to Liberal-Progressive
Brant
Grey North

Independent-Conservative to Liberal
Prescott
Rainy River

See also

Politics of Ontario
List of Ontario political parties
Premier of Ontario
Leader of the Opposition (Ontario)

Notes

References

Further reading
 

1934
1934 elections in Canada
1934 in Ontario
June 1934 events